Foreman (also known as The Foreman) is an open source complete life cycle systems management tool for provisioning, configuring and monitoring of physical and virtual servers. Foreman has deep integration to configuration management software, with Ansible, Puppet, Chef, Salt and other solutions through plugins, which allows users to automate repetitive tasks, deploy applications, and manage change to deployed servers.

Foreman provides provisioning on bare-metal (through managed DHCP, DNS, TFTP, and PXE-based unattended installations), virtualization and cloud. Foreman provides comprehensive, auditable interaction facilities, including a web frontend, a command line interface, and a robust REST API.

History
Initial development on Foreman started in July 2009 under a different project name. The initial release 0.1 was committed in September 2009 by Ohad Levy.

Availability
Foreman is targeted on Linux operating systems, but users reported successful installations on Microsoft Windows, BSD, and macOS.

The core Foreman team maintains repositories for various Linux distributions: Fedora, Red Hat Enterprise Linux (and derivatives such as CentOS), Debian, and Ubuntu.

Plugins
Foreman comes with freely available plugins to increase functionality. All plugins are available on GitHub.

Release history

See also

 Ansible (software)
 Chef (software)
 Puppet (software)
 Ruby on Rails
 Salt (software)

References

External links
 Community Forum
 
 Youtube Channel

Free software programmed in Ruby
Cross-platform free software
Configuration management
2009 software
Software using the GPL license
Provisioning